Newports Institute of Communications and Economics (NICE) is a private institute in Karachi, Sindh, Pakistan.

Degree programs

NICE offers following degree programs:

Bachelor's programs
 BBA (Hons.) 4 Year Program
 BS Computer Science 4 Years
 Bachelor of Commerce (B.Com) 4 Years Program
 BA - Textile Design 4 Years Program
 BA - Fashion Design 4 Years Program
 BA - Fine Arts 4 Years Program
 BS Electronics Engineering Technology 4 Year Program
 BS Electrical Engineering Technology 4 Year Program
 BS Mechanical Engineering Technology 4 Year Program
 BS Civil Engineering Technology 4 Year Program

Master's programs
 MBA (Regular) 3.5 Years
 MBA (Regular) 1.5 Years
 Executive MBA 2 Years Program
 Master of Commerce (M.Com) 2 Years
 MS (Computer Science) 2 Years

References

External links
 NICE official website

Educational institutions established in 1993
Universities and colleges in Karachi
1993 establishments in Pakistan